Dmitri Vladimirovich Piskunov (born 3 April 1969) is a Russian professional football coach and a former player.

External links
 

1969 births
Sportspeople from Perm, Russia
Living people
Soviet footballers
Russian footballers
Association football defenders
FC Energiya Volzhsky players
FC Rotor Volgograd players
FC SKA Rostov-on-Don players
FC Tekstilshchik Kamyshin players
FC Orenburg players
Russian Premier League players
Russian football managers
FC Nosta Novotroitsk players